Zalishchyky is a village in Chortkiv Raion (district) of Ternopil Oblast (province) in western Ukraine. It belongs to Buchach urban hromada, one of the hromadas of Ukraine. Small river Yazlovchyk (left tributary of the river Vilhovets) flows near of the village. In the village 473 inhabitants lived on 2003.

History 
First written mention comes from the 15th century. Then  belonged to the Polish–Lithuanian Commonwealth, from 1772 until 1918 to Austrian (Habsburg monarchy, Austrian Empire, Austria-Hungary) empires, in 1918-1919 to West Ukrainian People's Republic. From 1991 belonged to Ukraine. 

Reading room of Ukrainian society Prosvita operated in the village.

Until 18 July 2020, Zalishchyky belonged to Buchach Raion. The raion was abolished in July 2020 as part of the administrative reform of Ukraine, which reduced the number of raions of Ternopil Oblast to three. The area of Buchach Raion was merged into Chortkiv Raion.

Attractions 

 Church of St. George
 Church of the Blessed Virgin Mary 
 Chapel
 Monument to soldiers of Ukrainian Insurgent Army

People 
 Bohdan Vandiak, Ukrainian artist, poet 
 Antoni Prochaska, Polish historian

References

Sources

External links 
  Заліщики
 Zalishchyky, google maps
  

Villages in Chortkiv Raion